Crown Point Community School Corporation is a public school district based in Lake County, Indiana. The corporation was established in 1900, they have grades K-12. The Superintendent is Dr. Todd Terrill since July 2020 and the corporation operates 10 schools (7 elementary schools, 2 middle schools, and 1 high school) and serves over 8,000 students.

Schools
The Crown Point Community School Corporation operates 10 schools (1 high school, 2 middle schools, and 7 elementary schools) in Crown Point, Indiana.

District Schools

External links
 

School districts in Indiana
1900 establishments in Indiana
School districts established in 1900
K-12 schools